Fenne is the name of:

Surname
 Gisle Fenne (born 1963), Norwegian biathlete
 Hilde Fenne (born 1993), Norwegian biathlete
 Michael Fenne, alias of  David Kim Stanley

Given name
 Fenne Lily, Dorset-born, Bristol-based folk singer-songwriter
 Fenne Verrecas, Miss Earth delegate from Brazil